The Liga Uruguaya de Básquetbol (abbreviated as LUB; English: Uruguayan Basketball League) is the most important professional club basketball league in Uruguay. It is organized by the Uruguayan Basketball Federation (FUBB). The Uruguayan Basketball League competition began in 2003. Before that time, the Uruguayan basketball championships were only local metropolitan, and no competitions brought together all the clubs in the country. Until the Liga Uruguaya de Básquetbol was created, the capital clubs participated in the Campeonato Uruguayo Federal de Básquetbol (Uruguayan Federal Basketball Championship), while the clubs of the rest of the country competed in regional tournaments. The Uruguayan Federal Basketball Championship was founded in 1915, making it among the oldest on the continent.

The first LUB competition had a dramatic end, with a win in the last second, that brought the Uruguayan League title to Defensor Sporting, whom also repeated in the 2009–10 season. Some of the other League champions were: Salto Uruguay in 2004, Trouville in 2005–06, Malvín in 2006–07 and 2010–11, Biguá in 2007–08 and 2008–09, Hebraica Macabi in 2011–12, and Aguada in 2012–13. So far, there are only two teams that have appeared in all of the league's seasons; they are: Defensor Sporting and Trouville.

Format

The LUB was previously played in three stages: Torneo  (Qualifying Tournament), Súper Liga (Super League) and play-off.

 In the Qualifying Tournament, teams played in three separate leagues (Capital, Coast and South) according to their origin. In the Capital League the clubs played each other twice, home and away, and the first eight of the table played in the Super League, while the last three were relegated to the Second Division, to participate in the Torneo Metropolitano. Elsewhere, both the Coastal League and South Central League played their separate tournaments, where the first two qualified for the Super League.
 The Super League was contested by eight teams from the Capital League, two from the South League, and two from the Coast League. They were divided into two groups of six teams in each group, and played each other in two legs, home and away. Group A comprised the 1st, 3rd, 5th, and 7th of the Capital League, the 1st of the South League and 2nd of the Coast League. While Group B consisted of the 2nd, 4th, 6th, and 8th of the Capital League, the 2nd of the South League and 1st of Coast League. The four best placed teams from each group qualified for the playoffs, using a system of a double table. The first table considered only the points earned in the second phase of the Super League, and the top four advanced to the playoffs. The remaining positions were filled by clubs in Montevideo, with the best record, after adding half of the total in the Qualifying Tournament, and the total obtained in the Super League. This system was established because teams outside the capital only had to play a maximum of ten games to reach the Super League, while those in Montevideo had to  play about thirty games.
 Finally, teams competed in the playoffs, with series being best of five. The first stage was the quarterfinals. The qualifiers were played as: A) 1st A vs. 4th B, B) 2nd A vs. 3rd B, C) 1st B vs. 4th A and D) 2nd B vs. 3rd A. The semifinal pairings were: A) Winner vs. D) Winner and B) Winner vs. C) Winner. The winners of these matches played in the finals, with the winner being crowned as the league champions of the LUB.
 The worst teams of the league are demoted to the Second Division Torneo Metropolitano.

Participating teams
Defensor Sporting and Trouville are the teams with the most league appearances, having so far competed in every season of the LUB.

2019–20 season teams
Notes: All statistics are only for the Uruguayan Basketball League (Liga Uruguaya de Básquetbol), which is organized by the Uruguayan Basketball Federation (Federación Uruguaya de Basketball). Uruguayan Federal tournaments are not included. The "arena" column reflects the arena where the team plays most of its home games, but does not indicate that the team in question is the owner.

Former teams

Champions by season
The Uruguayan Basketball League competition began in 2003. Before that time, the Uruguayan Federal Championships were only local, and no competition brought together all the clubs in the country.

Total LUB titles by club

Awards

See also
Uruguayan Federal Basketball Championship (1915–2003)
Uruguayan Basketball Champions
Uruguayan Basketball Federation (FUBB)

References

External links

 FUBB 
 Liga Uruguaya on Basket Uruguay
 Uruguayan Basketball League at Latinbasket.com 

Liga Uruguaya de Basketball
2003 establishments in Uruguay
Basketball competitions in Uruguay
Uruguay
Basketball leagues in Uruguay
Sports leagues established in 2003